The 2017 Arizona Rattlers season was the twenty-fifth season for the professional indoor football franchise and first in the Indoor Football League (IFL). The Rattlers were one of ten teams that competed in the IFL for the 2017 season, the Rattlers were members of the Intense Conference.

Led by head coach Kevin Guy, the Rattlers played their home games at Talking Stick Resort Arena in Phoenix, Arizona.

Staff

Schedule
Key:

Regular season
All start times are local time

Standings

Postseason

Roster

References

External links
Arizona Rattlers official statistics 

Arizona Rattlers
Arizona Rattlers
Arizona Rattlers
2010s in Phoenix, Arizona
United Bowl champion seasons